Torgeir Schjerven (born 28 August 1954)  is a Norwegian author and lyric poet. Schjerven trained as a painter and has illustrated children's books. He has worked as a film actor in such films as Lasse & Geir (1976), directed by Svend Wam and Petter Vennerød) and Det tause flertall . The silent majority (1977, directed by Svend Wam). He was also involved in writing the script for these movies.

In 1995, Schjerven was one of the finalists for the Nordic Council's Literature Prize for the novel Omvei til Venus.

Torgeir Schjerven is married to the author Inger Elisabeth Hansen.

Bibliography

Poetry
 Vekk – poetry (1981)
 Nettenes melk – poetry (1986)
 Tanker og andre personlige bedrifter – poetry (1989)
 En nåde uten mål – poetry (1998)
 I anledning dagen – poetry (2002) (An oral edition published in 2003 was read by the author himself.)
Den stødige tilstundelsen av jubel i virkelig trist musikk – poetry (2006)

Novels
 I det blodige blå – novel (1984)
 Omvei til Venus – novel (1994)

Children's book
1992 – Hugo og de tre som forsvant, children's book written together with Inger Elisabeth Hansen, and illustrated by Hilde Kramer

Awards
 1986 – Hartvig Kirans minnepris
 1994 – Norwegian Critics Prize for Literature, for Omvei til Venus
 1995 – Nominated for the Nordic Council's Literature Prize for Omvei til Venus
 2002 – Halldis Moren Vesaas Prize
 2005 – Norwegian Academy Prize in memory of Thorleif Dahl

References

1954 births
Living people
Norwegian writers
Norwegian Critics Prize for Literature winners
20th-century Norwegian poets
Norwegian male poets
21st-century Norwegian poets
20th-century Norwegian male writers
21st-century Norwegian male writers